can refer to:

 "Te o Tsunagō", a 2008 song by Ayaka
 "Te o Tsunagō", a 2013 song by Shiritsu Ebisu Chugaku